Nicola Mocke (born 14 October 1980 in Fish Hoek) is a South African sprint canoer and marathon canoeist who competed in the late 2000s. At the 2008 Summer Olympics in Beijing, she finished seventh in the K-4 500 m event.

References
 Sports-Reference.com profile

1980 births
Living people
People from Fish Hoek
Canoeists at the 2008 Summer Olympics
Olympic canoeists of South Africa
South African female canoeists
Sportspeople from the Western Cape